The Brown Bag AllStars is an American rap group made up of J57, The Audible Doctor, Soul Khan, DeeJay Element and DJ E Holla. The group's repertoire of East Coast hip hop and underground hip hop blended with hard-core rap lyrics won them a spot in AllHipHop 's 2013 list of "Top 50 In Underground Hip-Hop".

Career

Early beginnings
The Brown Bag AllStars was formed in 2007 while its members were working and interning at Fat Beats. Koncept, Soul Khan and Cold Codeine were writing verses and freestyling on beats made by J57 and The Audible Doctor at Jesse Shatkin's studio until they went on to release their debut project titled The Brown Tape.

Later life
On 4 August 2009 while at Fat Beats, the Brown Bag AllStars released their debut mixtape titled The Brown Tape, released through Coalmine Records. The Brown Bag AllStars made an applaudable guest performance at the 2009 Brooklyn Hip-Hop Festival. In 2010, The Traveller and The Down Under Remixes EPs were released.

In 2011, the first of their annual end-of-the-year A Year In Review  compilation serial was released before they went on to release Brown Bag Season Vol. 1 which featured guest and vocal appearances from DJ Brace, Marco Polo. On 5 January 2015, they released the fourth A Year In Review compilation which featured notable acts like 50 Cent, Young Buck, Smoke DZA, Cage, DJ Rhettmatic, Phantogram and Pharoahe Monch.

Discography

Mixtapes

Singles & EP's

Albums

Compilations

Guest appearances

References

External links

Official website

Hardcore hip hop groups
Musical groups established in 2007
Musical groups from Brooklyn
American hip hop groups
East Coast hip hop groups
Hip hop groups from New York City
American contemporary R&B musical groups